The Dog Who Stopped the War (lit. "The Tuque War") is a 1984 Canadian drama film directed by André Melançon. The film was the first in the Tales for All (Contes pour tous) series of children's movies created by Les Productions la Fête.

Plot

The film involves a huge snowball fight between the children of a small town in Quebec during winter vacation who split into two rival gangs, one defending a snow castle, the other attacking it. The attackers are led by a boy who styles himself as "General Luc" and has a reputation for being bossy. The defenders are outnumbered and led by Marc, who owns a dog named Cleo. They also have the genius boy François on their side.  An observer, Danny Martin from Victoriaville, professes his neutrality but watches with interest.

François designs a massive, elaborate snow fortress, and Marc's group constructs it. Luc arrives with his army, wearing makeshift armour and wielding wooden swords. They attempt to scale the walls with a ladder, but Luc is injured in the battle and orders a retreat. They regroup and stage a second, more covert attack, but they are spotted and beaten back again with snowballs soaked in ink.

Luc counters by attacking a third time, this time with his army dressed in garbage bags as protection from the ink. They overwhelm the fort's defences, and Marc and François escape via toboggan through a secret tunnel. The two groups meet and agree to have one final battle to determine the winner.

Luc shows up for the final siege with an even larger army, having recruited additional (younger) children with chocolate. They also possess new weapons such as slingshots and a snowball cannon. Luc orders them to charge, and despite being slowed by barricades, they eventually breach the fortress walls and engage in melee combat with the defenders. Marc's dog Cleo comes after her owner, and one of the fortress walls collapses, killing her. The war ends, as both sides help bury her.

The song at the end of the movie is performed by Nathalie Simard. It's called "L'amour a pris son temps" ("Love Is On Our Side").

Reception
The film won the Golden Reel Award at the 6th Genie Awards in 1985, as Canada's top-grossing film of the previous year.

An animated remake, Snowtime! (La Guerre des tuques 3D), was released in 2015. It was followed by a spinoff television series called Snowsnaps and the sequel Racetime in 2018.

Home Video
A 2-disc special edition DVD release of the film was issued in 2009 by Imavision and a Blu-ray re-issue, using a remaster from the original 35mm camera negative, was released by Unidisc in 2015. Both versions contain the documentary "La Guerre des tuques...au fil du temps".

See also
Culture of Quebec
Cinema of Quebec
List of Quebec movies
List of Canadian films

References

External links 
 
 Productions La Fête

Films directed by André Melançon
1984 comedy-drama films
Canadian comedy-drama films
1984 films
Canadian children's drama films
Films set in Quebec
Films shot in Quebec
Miramax films
Children's comedy-drama films
Canadian Christmas drama films
French-language Canadian films
1980s Canadian films